Forza is a series of racing video games with two main sub-series: Forza Motorsport and Forza Horizon.

Forza may also refer to:

People
 Robert Forza, an Australian actor
 Roberto Forza (born 1957), an Italian cinematographer

Politics
 Forza Campania, defunct political party based in Campania
 Forza Europa, defunct centre-right European Parliament group
 Forza Europa (2017), liberal European Parliament group
 Forza Italia, a defunct Italian political party
 Forza Italia (2013), an Italian political party
 Forza Italia Giovani, the youth wing of the party founded in 2013
 Forza Kosova Party, Kosovan political party
 Forza Nazzjonali, defunct Maltese electoral force
 Forza! Nederland, a Dutch political party
 Forza Nuova, Italian neo-fascist party

Transport
 Honda Forza, a 244 cc scooter
 Naza Forza, a car manufactured in Malaysia
 Dodge Forza, also called Fiat Siena
 Ducati Forza, a make of motorcycle

Sport 
 A.S.D. Forza e Coraggio, a football club from Italy
 Forza F.C., a football club from the Philippines
 , a football club from Estonia
 Forza Bastia, film about French club Bastia's 1978 UEFA Cup Final first leg tie against Dutch club PSV Eindhoven
 Forza Milan!, defunct Italian sports magazine dedicated to football club A.C. Milan

Music 
 "Forza", short among music writers for La forza del destino, opera by Verdi
 "La Forza", song by Estonian singer Elina Nechayeva
 Forza Sempre, album by Brazilian singer Jerry Adriani
 Forza, album by Danish rapper Sivas

Other uses 
 Forza d'Agrò, town and commune in the Metropolitan City of Messina, Sicily
 "Forza", a deadly mist from the short story "Cookie Jar" by Stephen King
 The Reluctant Magician (Il Mago per forza), Italian comedy film
 Forza Rossa, Ferrari's Romanian branch
 Forza! Hidemaru, Japanese football-related anime television series

See also
 Laforza, an Italian sport utility vehicle